James "Jim" Rudd (birth unknown – death unknown) was an English professional rugby league footballer who played in the 1920s. He played at club level for Featherstone Rovers (Heritage № 50), and Dewsbury, as an occasional goal-kicking , i.e. number 7.

Background
Rudd was born in Oldham, Lancashire, England.

Playing career

Challenge Cup Final appearances
Rudd played  in Dewsbury's 2-13 defeat by Wigan in the 1929 Challenge Cup Final during the 1928–29 season at Wembley Stadium, London on Saturday 4 May 1929, in front of a crowd of 41,000.

Club career
Rudd made his début for Featherstone Rovers on Tuesday 25 December 1923, he appears to have scored no drop-goals (or field-goals as they are currently known in Australasia), but prior to the 1974–75 season all goals, whether; conversions, penalties, or drop-goals, scored 2-points, consequently prior to this date drop-goals were often not explicitly documented, therefore '0' drop-goals may indicate drop-goals not recorded, rather than no drop-goals scored. In addition, prior to the 1949–50 season, the archaic field-goal was also still a valid means of scoring points.

References

External links
Search for "Rudd" at rugbyleagueproject.org

Dewsbury Rams players
English rugby league players
Featherstone Rovers players
People from Oldham
Place of death missing
Rugby league halfbacks
Rugby league players from Oldham
Year of birth missing
Year of death missing